C. B. Fitzgerald (September 16, 1881 – July 20, 1971) was an American politician who served on the Seattle City Council from 1914 to 1919 and from 1921 to 1924 and as the Mayor of Seattle from 1919 to 1920.

References

1881 births
1971 deaths
Seattle City Council members
Mayors of Seattle
Washington (state) Republicans
20th-century American politicians